The 2017–18 season was the 115th season in the history of K.A.A. Gent and the club's 29th consecutive season in the top flight of Belgian football. In addition to the domestic league, Gent participated in this season's editions of the Belgian Cup and the UEFA Europa League.

Players

First-team squad

Out on loan

Pre-season and friendlies

Competitions

Overall record

First Division A

Regular season

Results summary

Results by round

Matches

Championship play-offs

Results summary

Results by round

Matches

Belgian Cup

UEFA Europa League

Third qualifying round

References

K.A.A. Gent seasons
Gent